Kwamena Dwamena-Aboagye is a Ghanaian politician and a Member of the Second Parliament of the Fourth Republic representing the Asuogyaman Constituency in the Eastern Region of Ghana.

Early life 
Aboagye was born at Asuogyaman in the Eastern Region of Ghana.

Politics 
Aboagye was first elected into Parliament on the ticket of the National Democratic Congress for the Asuogyaman Constituency in the Eastern Region of Ghana during the December 1996 Ghanaian General Elections. He polled 20,320 votes out of the 24,673 valid votes cast representing 51.40% over his opponents Ntow-Bediako Emmanuel of the New Patriotic Party who polled 4,032 representing 10.20% and John Arjarquah of the Convention People's Party who polled 321 votes representing 0.80%. He wa defeated in his Party's Parliamentary Elections by Dwamena Bekoe.

References 

Ghanaian MPs 1997–2001
National Democratic Congress (Ghana) politicians
People from Eastern Region (Ghana)
Living people
21st-century Ghanaian politicians
Year of birth missing (living people)